Nagliwang  is a village development committee in Parbat District in the Dhawalagiri Zone of central Nepal. At the time of the 1991 Nepal census it had a population of 2473 people living in 493 individual households.

References

External links
UN map of the municipalities of Parbat District

Populated places in Parbat District